Saleh Mohammed Kadhim (born 22 June 1963) is an Iraqi weightlifter. He competed in the men's light heavyweight event at the 1992 Summer Olympics.

References

1963 births
Living people
Iraqi male weightlifters
Olympic weightlifters of Iraq
Weightlifters at the 1992 Summer Olympics
Place of birth missing (living people)
Asian Games medalists in weightlifting
Weightlifters at the 1986 Asian Games
Asian Games silver medalists for Iraq
Medalists at the 1986 Asian Games
20th-century Iraqi people